China Education Ministry may refer to:

 Ministry of Education of the People's Republic of China, that regulates all aspects of the educational system in mainland China
 Ministry of Education (Republic of China), that is responsible for incorporating educational policies and managing public schools throughout the Free Area of the Republic of China